CTS News and Info is a digital television 24-hour news channel operated by Chinese Television System (CTS) in Taiwan. It used to be CTS Recreation until September 10, 2012.

On April 19, 2021, CTS News and Info Channel took over Taiwan's Cable Channel 52 replaced the rival CTi News, owned by the Want Want China Times Group after the National Communications Commission approved CTS News and Info Channel's transfer from cable channel 130 to cable channel 52.

Opening and Closing times
CTS Main Channel is on air 24 hours each day.

Except for the last Thursday of every month at 4 AM, it will be closed for one hour for system testing, and then the broadcast will resume at 5 AM.

References

Television stations in Taiwan
Television channels and stations established in 2006
Taiwan Broadcasting System
24-hour television news channels in Taiwan